Lea Fite (January 4, 1955 – October 26, 2009) was an Alabama state legislator.  Fite was elected as a Democrat to the Alabama House of Representatives in 2002. He attended Jacksonville State University and was a supermarket owner. Fite died of a seizure on October 26, 2009.

Lea Fite was instrumental in passing legislation in the Alabama House of Representatives to close a loophole denying coverage to victims of breast and cervical cancer.

Fite was known for bridging the gap between Republicans and Democrats in the Alabama State Legislature.

Fite was a politician reminiscent of better times.  He was deeply connected with his constituents, and served the community both in a capacity as a politician and local community member.

References

Democratic Party members of the Alabama House of Representatives
Jacksonville State University alumni
1955 births
2009 deaths
20th-century American politicians